HD 85512 b is a currently-disputed exoplanet orbiting HD 85512, a K-type main-sequence star approximately 37 light-years from Earth in the constellation of Vela.

Due to its mass of at least 3.6 times the mass of Earth, HD 85512 b is classified as a rocky Earth-size exoplanet (< 5M🜨) and is one of the smallest exoplanets discovered to be just outside the inner edge of the habitable zone. HD 85512 b, along with Gliese 581 d, was once considered to be one of the best candidates for habitability in 2011.

Physical characteristics

Mass, radius and temperature 
The planet has a minimum Earth mass of 3.6 ± 0.5, minimum surface gravity of about 1.4 g and assuming an atmosphere like Earth's despite its far greater mass, an estimated temperature of 298 K (24.85 °C or 76.73 °F) at the top of its atmosphere. The estimated temperature is noted to be similar to temperatures in Southern France, but various atmospheric conditions prevalent in the planet have to be analyzed to estimate the temperature of the surface.  An estimated radius of 1.3  is possible based on its mass.

Host star 
The planet orbits a (K-type) star named HD 85512. The star has a mass of 0.69  and a radius of around 0.53 . It has a surface temperature of 4715 K and is 5.61 billion years old. In comparison, the Sun is about 4.6 billion years old and has a surface temperature of 5778 K.

The star's apparent magnitude, or how bright it appears from Earth's perspective, is 7.43 Therefore, HD 85512 is too dim to be seen with the naked eye, but can be viewed using good binoculars.

Orbit 
The planet orbits the parent star (which has about 11% of the Sun's luminosity) at a distance of about 0.26 AU, with an orbital period of about 54 days, and is possibly tidally locked.

Habitability and climate 

Models generated by Pepe et al (2011) suggest that for the temperature to be below 270 K (-3.15 °C), for a circular orbit, the planetary albedo should be 0.48 ± 0.05 and for an eccentricity of 0.11, the planetary albedo should be 0.52. If the planet has 50% cloud cover, water may exist in liquid form on the planet provided its atmosphere is similar to our own, thus increasing the planet's habitability potential. Also, if the albedo of the planet is increased due to cloud cover, water could be present in its liquid form on the planet, which would mean that the planet is on the edge of the habitability zone.

However, PHL's new definition of the circumstellar habitable zone classifies this planet in the "too hot" zone, and it considers the planet "not habitable".

The planet would likely be inhospitable because of a runaway greenhouse effect on its surface. Little amounts of carbon dioxide would have been present, as HD 85512 b was probably an ocean planet (with little to no landmasses) very shortly after its star was formed into the main sequence, before the stellar flux increased to its estimated present state. The surface pressure would have also increased to about 100 times Earth's surface pressure (100 kilopascals, 100 atm) because of the amount of water vapor in the atmosphere. Thus, HD 85512 b is likely a desert planet rather than an ocean planet because of the increased stellar flux.

Discovery 
HD 85512 b was discovered by scientists at University of Geneva, Switzerland, led by Swiss astronomer Stéphane Udry of the Guaranteed Time Observations (GTO) program of High Accuracy Radial velocity Planet Searcher (HARPS), a high-precision echelle spectrograph installed on ESO's 3.6 m telescope at La Silla Observatory in Chile. The team used the Doppler spectroscopy technique which determines the minimum mass of the planet through slight changes in motion of the parent star. It was discovered on August 17, 2011.

On August 17, 2011, researchers released a study of the planet. The study makes assumptions about the planet actually having the minimum mass allowed by existing observations, not being tidally locked, and having one specific composition out of the wide parameter set available to conclude that HD 85512 b is the most habitable exoplanet discovered up to that point and one of the most stable exoplanets discovered by the High Accuracy Radial Velocity Planet Searcher.

In 2023, a study reassessed the radial velocity data of HD 85512. A signal was detected with a period of 51 days, inconsistent with the previously published 58-day orbital period of HD 85512 b, but consistent with previous estimates of the stellar rotation period. This indicates that the signal is very likely to be caused by the stellar rotation, rather than an orbiting planet.

Possibility as target for interstellar probe 
Reaching this planet at the current record spacecraft speed, the Helios Probes' , would take 156,971 years.

See also 

Carbon planet
Circumstellar habitable zone
Earth analog
Gliese 581 d
Gliese 581 g
Gliese 667 Cc
Habitable zone
Kepler 22 b
Planetary habitability
Super-Earth

References

External links 
 A Habitable Planet around HD 85512

HD 85512
Exoplanets discovered in 2011
Exoplanets detected by radial velocity
Near-Earth-sized exoplanets
Vela (constellation)